Guatemalan Spanish is the national variant of Spanish spoken in the Central American country of Guatemala. About 13.7 million of the 17 million population speak Spanish.

Phonetics and phonology

Seseo is common to all of Latin American Spanish, and the Andalusian and Canarian Spanish varieties within Spain.
  is realized as glottal .
 Syllable-final  is only occasionally aspirated, and only when before consonants or a pause. It's weakened less often than in any other Central American dialect. 
 Word-final  is pronounced velar .
The alveolar trill  is often assibilated to a fricative . In central Guatemala,  is often pronounced as an affricate, almost like the English . This is more common after consonants, as in  'between'. It's not as frequent in Guatemala as in Costa Rica or the Andes and is less common among younger and urban speakers.

Grammar

Very rarely a demonstrative can go before the possessive pronoun, like  .
This construction was occasional in Old Spanish and still found in Judaeo-Spanish, but its frequency in El Salvador and Guatemala is due to similar constructions being found in various Mayan languages.

Vocabulary
A number of words widely used in Guatemala which have Mayan or other native origins, in particular names for flora, fauna and toponyms.  Some of these words are used in most, or all, Spanish-speaking countries, like chocolate and aguacate ("avocado"), and some are only used in Mexico and most Central American countries, like Guatemala and El Salvador. The latter include guajolote "turkey" < Nahuatl huaxōlōtl  (although chompipe is also used; pavo is also used, as in other Spanish-speaking countries); papalote "kite" < Nahuatl pāpālōtl  "butterfly"; and jitomate "tomato" < Nahuatl xītomatl . For a more complete list see List of Spanish words of Nahuatl origin. Local words include

There are also many words unique to Central America, for example, chunche or chochadas or babosadas means "thing" or stuff in some places. The words used to describe children (or kids) vary among the countries in Central America; in Guatemala they are often called patojos. Cipotes is also used in Guatemala in the eastern departments. In the western and northern departments of Guatemala "chamacos" is used to say children or kids. In Guatemala and Honduras the word güiros is also used. In Guatemala (also in Honduras and El Salvador) people with money are said to have pisto, a term originally used by Maya peoples in Guatemala.

See also
 Languages of Guatemala
 Central American Spanish

Notes

References

 

Languages of Guatemala
Central American Spanish